Lamaiti is an administrative ward in the Bahi District of the Dodoma Region of United Republic of Tanzania. In 2016 the Tanzania National Bureau of Statistics report there were 13,333 people in the ward, from 12,268 in 2012.

References

Wards of Dodoma Region